Niente, also called quasi niente , is a musical dynamic often used at the end of a piece to direct the performer to fade the music away to little more than a bare whisper, normally gradually with a diminuendo, al niente. It is often written as "" or "". It is also used to direct the performer to fade into a note without any articulation at the beginning of the note, known as dal niente (from nothing): "".

Niente is distinct from a rest "in that [during niente] the musician is engaged in making sound, but so softly that the sound can not be heard."

See also
Ensemble Dal Niente
Morendo
Pensato

References 

Musical terminology
Musical notation
Italian words and phrases